Greystoke is a village and civil parish on the edge of the Lake District National Park in Cumbria, England, about  west of Penrith. At the 2001 census the parish had a population of 642, increasing marginally to 654 at the 2011 Census. The village centres on a green surrounded by stone houses and cottages.

Buildings
Buildings in the village include St Andrew's parish church, which dates from the 13th century; Greystoke Castle, built by Baron Greystock in the 16th century and which stands in a  park; the Boot & Shoe public house; and the outdoor swimming pool.

To the east of the village are three folly farmsteads built about 1789 by Charles Howard, 11th Duke of Norfolk, of Greystoke Castle: Fort Putnam, Bunker's Hill and Spire House.

St Andrew's Church
St Andrew's is a major church building due to its size, which is considerable for such a small parish.

Two of the first parsons were influential Savoyards. Firstly Henri of Grandson younger brother of the important friend and envoy of King Edward I of England, Otto de Grandson. Henri of Grandson would later become Bishop of Verdun then not in France but an important bishopric within the Holy Roman Empire. He was followed as parson by his relative Gérard of Vuippens who would also become an important diplomat for King Edward I of England in negotiating an end to the war with King Philip IV of France and later Bishop of Lausanne.

It was refounded as a collegiate church in 1382, by William, 14th Baron Greystoke, for a master, seven chaplains and six chantry priests. However the present building, in the Perpendicular style, is reckoned to date from the 16th and 17th centuries. It had a restoration in 1818, and then in 1848-49 it had another restoration under the architect Anthony Salvin. The nave is narrow, but the aisles are wide, with big windows, but it has no clerestory or west window. There are a number of effigies, including William, 14th Baron, and John, 16th Baron.

There is an impressive memorial to Henry Charles Howard of Greystoke, designed by Sir Robert Lorimer in the Arts and Crafts style, which dates from 1914. 
There are six bells which are hung for ringing in the English full-circle style.

Notable people
Bishop John Law was born at Greystoke in 1745.
William de Greystoke, 2nd Baron Greystoke, buried at St. Andrew's Church
John Greystoke, 4th Baron Greystoke, buried at St. Andrew's Church
Henri of Grandson, Bishop of Verdun and diplomat for King Edward I of England was a pastor at St. Andrews Church 
Gérard of Vuippens, Bishop of Lausanne and diplomat for King Edward I of England was a pastor at St. Andrews Church

Governance
An electoral ward of the same name exists. This ward stretches south west to Threlkeld with a total population of 1,374.

Gallery

See also

Listed buildings in Greystoke, Cumbria

Notes

External links

  Cumbria County History Trust: Greystoke (nb: provisional research only - see Talk page)
Greystoke at visitcumbria.com
Greystoke Castle
 Hear Greystoke's bells here
 Greystoke Village Website

 
Civil parishes in Cumbria
Villages in Cumbria
Folly castles in England
Inglewood Forest